Thotawattege Don Manuel Titus de Silva (Sinhala:ටයිටස් තොටවත්ත), popularly as Titus Thotawatte, was a Sri Lankan director and editor who made several popular Sri Lankan action movies in the 1960s and 1970s and later developed Sinhala children's programmes. Thotawatte died on 15 October 2011 in Colombo.

Early life
He was born on 17 April 1927 in Colombo. He was the fourth child in a family of five children, with 3 elder brothers and one younger sister. He attended Ananda College in Colombo and studied art under J.D.A. Perera and Stanley Abeysinghe and Matara Technical College.

Career
Thottawatte joined Lester James Peries and Willie Blake as editor to make Rekava in 1956. It was an attempt to make a truly Sinhalese movie in contrast with the Southern Indian copies then in vogue.

Thottawatte debuted as a director with Chandiya in 1965. The film starred Gamini Fonseka in the first villains role of Sinhala Cinema. Other early films include Kauda Hari (1969), Thewatha (1970) and Haralaksaya (1971).

In 1980,Thotawatte wrote and directed the children's movie Handaya, which was awarded Best Picture at the Sarasaviya Film Festival.

In the 1980s and 1990s, he dubbed English cartoons such as Bugs Bunny, Doctor Dolittle and Top Cat into Sinhala for Sinhalese audiences with the popular titles Ha Ha Hari Hawa, Dosthara Honda Hitha and Pissu Pusa respectively. He is considered to be the pioneer of dubbing programmes in Sri Lanka. These continue to air on Sinhala Television channels. Thotawatte created puppet characters like Eluson.

When the first National Media Awards took place in Sri Lanka, Thotawatte, was awarded a gold medal for his contribution to television and media in Sri Lanka.

Filmography

References

External links
 

1929 births
2011 deaths
Sri Lankan film directors